Marc Rosset  (born 7 November 1970) is a Swiss former professional tennis player. He is best known for winning the men's singles gold medal at the 1992 Summer Olympics. He also won a major doubles title, at the French Open in 1992 partnering compatriot Jakob Hlasek.

Career
Rosset turned professional in 1988 and won his first tour singles title in 1989 in Geneva as a wildcard, defeating Guillermo Pérez Roldán. His first doubles title was won in Geneva as well in 1991 with partner Sergi Bruguera.

1992 was the pinnacle of Rosset's career. Representing Switzerland at the Olympic Games in Barcelona, he defeated several top players en route to qualifying for the men's singles final, including Jim Courier, Goran Ivanišević, Wayne Ferreira, and Emilio Sánchez. In the final, he faced Spain's Jordi Arrese and won an exciting five-set match to claim the gold medal. Rosset also won the 1992 French Open men's doubles title with partner Jakob Hlasek. Rosset also was a member of the Swiss team which reached the final of the 1992 Davis Cup. Switzerland lost in the final to the United States despite Rosset's winning a five-set singles rubber against Jim Courier (who was ranked world No. 1 at the time).

Rosset's most memorable Davis Cup match came in defeat in a singles rubber against Arnaud Clément of France in 2001, which he lost 15–13 in the fifth set after 5 hours and 46 minutes. During the later years of his playing career, Rosset also served as the Swiss Davis Cup team captain.

Rosset also enjoyed success playing in other international team competitions for Switzerland. In 1996, he was a member of the teams which won the World Team Cup and finished runners-up in the Hopman Cup. That year he also achieved his best performance at a Grand Slam, the 1996 French Open when he defeated Carl-Uwe Steeb, Jiří Novák, Jakob Hlasek, Stefan Edberg and Bernd Karbacher before losing to Michael Stich in the semifinals.

Rosset had a 2–2 record against his successor as Switzerland's top male tennis player, Roger Federer. Rosset won their first two meetings in 2000 (including the final of the Open 13 at Marseille), but Federer won their meetings in 2001 and 2003.

At 2.01 meters (6 ft. 7 in.), Rosset was one of the game's tallest players throughout his career. He was one of the game's fastest servers and most prolific servers of aces for most of his career.

Rosset changed his flight plans after a first-round defeat at the US Open in September 1998. After he changed his plans, the flight he had originally planned to take, Swissair Flight 111, crashed in the Atlantic Ocean, killing all on board.

Rosset's career-high ATP singles ranking was world No. 9, and his career-high doubles ranking was world No. 8. He won a total of 15 top-level singles titles and eight doubles titles. He won at least one singles title on all surfaces: clay, grass, carpet, and hard court.

Career statistics

Grand Slam finals

Doubles: 1 (1 title)

Olympic Games

Singles: 1 (1 gold medal)

Career finals

Singles: 23 (15–8)

Singles performance timeline

Doubles: 12 (8–3)

Team competition: 1 (1 title, 2 runner-ups)

Top 10 wins

References

External links
 
 
 
Interview at rowztennis.com

Swiss male tennis players
Olympic tennis players of Switzerland
Tennis players at the 1992 Summer Olympics
Tennis players at the 1996 Summer Olympics
Olympic gold medalists for Switzerland
People from Monte Carlo
Swiss expatriates in Monaco
Tennis players from Geneva
1970 births
Living people
Olympic medalists in tennis
Hopman Cup competitors
Grand Slam (tennis) champions in men's doubles
Medalists at the 1992 Summer Olympics
French Open champions